Manana Island is an island in Lincoln County, Maine, United States, lying adjacent to Monhegan island, about  off Pemaquid Point on the mainland. The island is part of the Plantation of Monhegan.

It is the site of the Manana Island Sound Signal Station, which is listed on the National Register of Historic Places.  Archeological sites on the island include a petroglyph and a stone cairn.

A small herd of goats spends summers on the island. They winter in Kennebunk and are rowed over to Manana Island from the Monhegan Harbor in spring.

See also
List of islands of Maine

References

Islands of Lincoln County, Maine
Islands of Maine
Coastal islands of Maine